The Navy Comes Through is a 1942 American World War II film directed by A. Edward Sutherland. It stars Pat O'Brien, George Murphy and Jane Wyatt. Vernon L. Walker and James G. Stewart were nominated for an Oscar for Best Special Effects. The film was based on Borden Chase's 1939 short story "Pay to Learn". The working titles of the film were
Pay to Learn and Battle Stations. The film was the first RKO Pictures use of a new radio signal trademark that spelled out the word "victory." Prior to this, the studio's radio signal trademark spelled out "RKO."

Plot
In 1940, the testimony of Chief Gunner's Mate Mike Mallory at a United States Navy Board of Inquiry regarding a fatal gun turret accident helps end the career of Lieutenant Tom Sands. The situation is complicated by the fact that Sands and Mallory's sister Myra are in love. Afterward, Sands resigns his commission and breaks up with Myra, telling her there is no future for them.

When the United States enters World War II, however, Sands rejoins the Navy as an enlisted man. By chance, he is assigned to Mallory, to their mutual displeasure. They and the rest of Mallory's men are disappointed to be assigned to man the guns of the freighter Sybil Gray. When Myra comes to see her brother off (though she is assigned to the same convoy as a Navy nurse), she encounters Sands, whom she had not seen since the inquiry.

On board, Coxswain G. Berringer recognizes Sands, making him a pariah among the navy sailors. On the voyage to England, they are attacked by a German U-boat on the surface. They exchange fire, before the submarine is driven off by escorting warships. Doctor Lieutenant Commander Murray and Myra are brought aboard to perform surgery on Bayless, seriously injured in the fighting. They remain on the ship to avoid delaying the convoy further. A near encounter with a German pocket battleship in the fog causes Sands to admit to Myra that he still loves her.

Later, two German airplanes strafe and bomb the Sybil Gray. When Myra is knocked out by falling debris, Sands abandons his machine gun to carry her to safety. While he is gone, Berringer, the other sailor manning the gun, is fatally wounded. The two aircraft are shot down, but the sailors now believe that Sands is a coward.

When "Babe" Duttson's radio intercepts a German message, Austrian-born "Dutch" Croner is able to interpret it. He informs Mallory that a German U-boat supply ship is nearby. Mallory persuades the freighter's captain to change course and capture the vessel. Unbeknownst to the Americans, once the German captain realizes he cannot get away, he has one of the torpedoes rigged to explode after a delay, but the suspicious Sands foils that scheme.

Then, he disobeys Mallory's order to guide the German ship to Belfast. He has decided they can load unsuspecting U-boats with booby-trapped torpedoes. As Sands is the only qualified navigator available, Mallory has no choice but to agree. The plan goes without a hitch the first three times, but an officer on the fourth submarine recognizes Dutch as a famous anti-Nazi violinist. The two ships exchange fire. Then another U-boat surfaces and joins the battle. The Americans sink both submarines, but the hold of the supply ship is set on fire. When Mallory goes to deal with it, he is overcome by the fumes. Sands rescues him.  After the action, Sands questions Mallory about his actions during the battle that endangered their ship. Mallory admits the situation was similar to that in which he testified against Sands—except that no one survived to prove that Sands was not negligent. Returning to the United States, the Board of Inquiry is reconvened and Sands is reinstated as an officer.

Cast
Pat O'Brien as Chief Michael "Mike" Mallory
George Murphy as Lieutenant/Seaman 2c Thomas L. "Tom" Sands
Jane Wyatt as Myra Mallory
Jackie Cooper as Joe "Babe" Duttson
Carl Esmond as Richard "Dutch" Croner
Max Baer as Coxswain G. Berringer
Desi Arnaz as Pat Tarriba, a Cuban who enlists to repay American help in freeing Cuba
Ray Collins as Captain McCall
Lee Bonnell as Kovac
Frank Jenks as Sampier
John Maguire as James Bayless
Frank Fenton as Hodum
Joey Ray as James Dennis
Marten Lamont as Lieutenant Commander Murray
Helmut Dantine as a Frightened German Seaman 
Bud Geary as Quartermaster McPhail

Reception
Thomas M. Pryor of The New York Times called the plot "hackneyed" but wrote that it was directed "with a good sense of melodramatic pace" and that the two lead actors played their roles well. Variety wrote: "This is an actionful, exciting naval adventure with strong romantic interest ... The battle sequences are especially effective." Harrison's Reports called it a "pretty good war melodrama ... Although the story is, at times, on the fanciful side, it has been presented in so thrilling a fashion that the interest never lags." Film Daily reported: "Excellent masculine entertainment is offered by this thunderbolt of excitement."

Box office
The film was a surprise hit and earned a profit of $542,000.

References

External links

1942 films
1942 war films
1940s American films
1940s English-language films
American black-and-white films
American World War II films
Films about the United States Navy in World War II
Films based on American short stories
Films directed by A. Edward Sutherland
Films scored by Roy Webb
RKO Pictures films
World War II films made in wartime